In the United States, the Assistant Secretary of Defense for International Security Affairs or ASD (ISA) is the principal advisor to the Under Secretary of Defense for Policy (USD (P)) and the United States Secretary of Defense on international security strategy and policy on issues of Department of Defense (DoD) interest related to the governments and defense establishments of the nations and international organizations of Europe (including the North Atlantic Treaty Organization), the Middle East, Africa, and the Western Hemisphere. The ASD (ISA) also oversees security cooperation programs and foreign military sales programs in these regions. Despite the broad title of the office, the ASD (ISA) does not develop policy related to Asia, the Pacific region, Latin America, or South America.

Responsibilities 
According to a description provided by the Office of the USD (P), the ASD (ISA) shall:

 Conduct and manage day-to-day, multilateral, regional, and bilateral defense relations with all foreign governments in assigned areas of responsibility.
 Develop regional security and defense strategy and policy, provide advice, and issue guidance to translate global and functional policies into regional-specific country strategies, and oversee their implementation in coordination with cognizant DoD officials.
 For countries in assigned areas of responsibility, develop, coordinate, and oversee the implementation of:
 Defense security policy and management of defense and military relations
 Policy, plans, and activities, as well as uses of DoD resources engaged in encouraging the development of military capabilities, constitutional democracy and respect for human rights, including civilian control of the military, institutionalizing an appropriate role for the military in a constitutional democracy, and encouraging the development of standards of military professionalism that promote respect for elected civilian authorities and human rights.
 DoD policy and recommendations concerning security cooperation programs and organizations, foreign military sales, military education and training, and other missions pertaining to security cooperation program relationships.
 Develop, coordinate, and oversee the implementation of policy related to NATO, Euro-Atlantic Partnership Council, the Partnership for Peace, and other institutions with a security dimension including the European Union, Organization for Security and Cooperation in Europe (OSCE), and the African Union.
 Provide policy guidance and oversight to the Defense Advisor, U.S. Mission to NATO, and Representative of the Secretary of Defense Representative to the OSCE on behalf of the Under Secretary of Defense for Policy. Promote coordination, cooperation, and joint planning on nuclear policy and strategy with NATO Allies, in coordination with the Assistant Secretary of Defense for Special Operations/Low Intensity Conflict and Interdependent Capabilities.
 Support the NATO Nuclear Planning Group and its subordinate body, the High Level Group and chair the High Level Group.
 Represent the Under Secretary of Defense for Policy and the Secretary of Defense in interagency policy deliberations and international negotiations dealing with assigned areas of responsibility.
 Monitor and provide policy recommendations related to the conduct of U.S. military operations in the countries or regions of focus or on the participation of such countries in operations outside of the region.
 Perform such other functions as the Under Secretary of Defense for Policy or the Secretary of Defense may prescribe.

Office holders 
The table below includes both the various titles of this post over time, as well as all the holders of those offices.

Structure
This office can trace its roots back to the early days of the modern national security establishment. It was created in 1949, two years after the National Security Act established the Department of Defense.

The ASD (ISA) is supported by seven Deputy Assistant Secretaries (DASDs), each with coverage of a different region or international organization. The DASDs manage "principal directors" who in turn oversee "country directors" with more narrow geographic portfolios:

Deputy Assistant Secretary of Defense for African Affairs
Deputy Assistant Secretary of Defense for Europe and NATO
Deputy Assistant Secretary of Defense for Middle East
Deputy Assistant Secretary of Defense for Russia, Ukraine, & Eurasia
Deputy Assistant Secretary of Defense for Western Hemisphere
Secretary of Defense Representative in the U.S. Mission to NATO
Secretary of Defense Representative to the Organization for Security and Co-operation in Europe

DASDs are appointed by the Secretary of Defense. Some are appointed from civilian life, while others are career defense officials. Once at the DASD level, the latter are considered a part of the DoD Senior Executive Service.

The ASD (ISA) is also supported by a Principal Deputy, or PDASD, who helps manage the day-to-day operations.

Principal Deputy Assistant Secretaries for International Security Affairs

Deputy Assistant Secretaries of Defense Reporting to the ASD (ISA)
The list below details the current and former DASDs in this office.

See also
 Under Secretary of Defense for Policy
 Assistant Secretary of Defense for Global Strategic Affairs
 Assistant Secretary of Defense for Asian and Pacific Security Affairs
 Assistant Secretary of Defense for Homeland Defense and Americas' Security Affairs

References